Mwebantu is a national news agency headquartered in Lusaka and is one of the leading online news website and social media platform in Zambia. Mwebantu.com is their flagship website which is an online based news publication catering for local Zambians and those in the diaspora.

, Chilambe Katuta served as editor-in-chief.

The innovation of the publication was concentrating on breaking news and live coverage of events. Mwebantu reporters and photographers are based in Lusaka and they travel wherever the news is happening. Mwebantu is also supported by a number of correspondents across the country.

Market Share
Mwebantu is ranked as one of the biggest online news site in Zambia, according to Socialbakers. Mwebantu has redefined online advertising with its social, content-driven publishing technology in Zambia. In Zambia, Mwebantu provides the most shared news, stories and entertainment across the web and social media platforms of Facebook, Twitter and Instagram to its audience of more than 1 million plus daily users and growing. The news service is available on desktop and on mobile.

History
Mwebantu was founded in 2012 by Chilambe Katuta, a Thomson Reuters Foundation Alumni. Thomson Reuters Foundation is the charitable arm of Thomson Reuters, the global news and information provider.

The Mwebantu website was designed by Kasonde Mulenga a Web and Systems Developer from the University of Greenwich in London, England.

The word 'Mwebantu' in local languages can literally be translated into “You the People”.

References

External links
 
 

Newspapers published in Zambia
Zambian news websites
Internet properties established in 2012